The following lists events that happened in 1976 in Iceland.

Incumbents
President – Kristján Eldjárn
Prime Minister – Geir Hallgrímsson

Events

Births

1 February – Katrín Jakobsdóttir, politician
9 May – Ásthildur Helgadóttir, footballer.
24 December – Sveinn Rúnar Sigurðsson, musician

Deaths
22 January – Hermann Jónasson, politician (b. 1896)
6 December – Magnús Brynjólfsson, alpine skier (b. 1923).

References

 
1970s in Iceland
Iceland
Iceland
Years of the 20th century in Iceland